Lago di San Floriano is a lake in the Province of Grosseto, Tuscany. At an elevation of 6 m, its surface area is 0.3 km².

Lakes of Tuscany